Donald Elder is a former professional American football player who played cornerback for six seasons for the New York Jets, Detroit Lions, Pittsburgh Steelers, Tampa Bay Buccaneers, and San Diego Chargers.

Living people
People from Chattanooga, Tennessee
American football cornerbacks
American football return specialists
New York Jets players
Detroit Lions players
Pittsburgh Steelers players
Tampa Bay Buccaneers players
San Diego Chargers players
Memphis Tigers football players
1962 births